Martín Alejandro Fúriga Sande (born 22 January 1976) is an Argentine retired footballer who played as a striker.

External links
 Argentine League statistics  
 Stats at Liga de Fútbol Profesional 
 

1976 births
Living people
Footballers from La Plata
Argentine footballers
Association football forwards
Argentine Primera División players
Estudiantes de La Plata footballers
A.C. Ancona players
Sport Boys footballers
Segunda División players
Segunda División B players
Tercera División players
Levante UD footballers
Logroñés CF footballers
Argentine expatriate footballers
Expatriate footballers in Italy
Expatriate footballers in Peru
Expatriate footballers in Spain
Argentine expatriate sportspeople in Spain